Seymour Stein (born April 18, 1942) is an American entrepreneur and music executive. He co-founded Sire Records and was Vice President of Warner Bros. Records. With Sire, Stein signed bands that became central to the new wave era of the 1970s and 80s, including Talking Heads, the Ramones, and The Pretenders; he signed Madonna as well. He was inducted into the Rock and Roll Hall of Fame in 2005.

Music career 
Stein was born in New York City in Brooklyn. As a high school student, he interned in the summers of 1957 and 1958 at King Records in Cincinnati, Ohio.  He took on a clerk position for music industry magazine Billboard in 1958 and starting in 1961 worked for two years for King Records.

In 1966, Stein and record producer Richard Gottehrer founded Sire Productions, which led to the formation of Sire Records, the label under which he signed pioneer artists such as the Ramones and Talking Heads in 1975, the Pretenders in 1980, and Madonna in 1982. Other acts signed by Sire include The Replacements, Depeche Mode, The Smiths, The Cure,  Ice-T, Ministry, The Undertones, and Echo & the Bunnymen. In 1966, Stein had an opportunity to sign Jimi Hendrix, praising him for his original material, but ultimately decided against doing so after witnessing Hendrix smash his guitar on one occasion and argue with his friend, Linda Keith, on successive occasions. 

Such was Stein's influence in signing and promoting the new wave genre of music that he is sometimes credited with coming up with the name as an alternative to the term punk, which he found derogative. The term had previously been used to refer to the French New Wave film movement of the 1960s.

Stein was the President of Sire Records and also Vice President of Warner Bros. Records until his announced retirement on July 18, 2018. He had had a marketing and distribution deal from 1976 to 1994 and again from April 2003 until retirement. He was inducted into the Rock and Roll Hall of Fame on March 14, 2005, under the lifetime-achievement category. On June 9, 2016, Stein was honored with the Richmond Hitmaker Award at the Songwriters Hall of Fame.

Legacy
Stein is the subject of an eponymous song by the Scottish musical group Belle and Sebastian. He was the winner of a Lifetime Achievement Award at the International Dance Music Awards in 2010. Ice-T wrote about Stein in his autobiography, stating: "He's cut from that cloth of the old-time music executives like Clive Davis, but he's way more eccentric...  Just a little more bizarre, a bit more avant-garde, more of an edgy cat." He wrote that Stein would never edit Ice-T's musical output but would sometimes express concerns (e.g. he was against homophobia in rap).

Personal life 
Stein was formerly married to the late music promoter and real estate executive Linda Stein; together, the couple had two daughters before they divorced, on amicable terms, in the late 1970s. Stein has never remarried. He revealed he was gay in 2017. One of his children is filmmaker Mandy Stein. Stein's eldest daughter, Samantha, died as a result of brain cancer in 2013 at the age of 40.  Stein published his autobiography, Siren Song: My Life in Music, in 2018.

References

External links
 Biography by the Rock and Roll Hall of Fame
 Interview with Seymour Stein – The Citizen (South Africa), August 17, 2006
 [ Seymour Stein biography] at Allmusic.com
 Seymour Stein lyrics (Sung By Belle and Sebastian)  – at Belleandsebastian.com
 Interview with Seymour Stein by Terry Gross of Fresh Air, October 15, 2009
 A Real Live Sire : Seymour Stein On Half A Century In The Music Business –  [PIAS]'s Blog, April 21, 2015

1942 births
American music industry executives
Record producers from New York (state)
People from Brooklyn
American people of German descent
Living people
American LGBT businesspeople